Michal Feinblat (born 26 August 1984 in Bnei Brak) is an Israeli judoka who competed in the women's half-lightweight category. She held five Israeli senior titles in her division between 2000 and 2004, picked up a total of eleven medals in her career, and represented her nation Israel in the 52-kg class at the 2004 Summer Olympics.

Feinblat qualified as a lone female judoka for the Israeli squad in the women's half-lightweight class (52 kg) at the 2004 Summer Olympics in Athens, based on her ranking in the European top 5 under her respective category from the International Judo Federation. She received a bye in the first round, but lost her opening match to Portugal's Telma Monteiro, who scored an ippon victory and threw her down the tatami with a kuchiki taoshi (single leg takedown) assault at three minutes and forty-three seconds.

In 2007, during training, she injured her shoulder and had surgery but was unable to return to Judo. In 2016, she joined the Israeli Paralympic rowing team and competed in the Mixed coxed four category. They competed at the 2020 Summer Paralympics and finished 6th in the Mixed coxed four event.

References

External links
 
 
 
 Michal Feinblat at JewsInSports.org

1984 births
Living people
Israeli female judoka
Olympic judoka of Israel
Judoka at the 2004 Summer Olympics
People from Bnei Brak